Bethera is an unincorporated community in Berkeley County in the Lowcountry of South Carolina about  north of Charleston. The elevation of the community is

History
The name "Bethera" is an amalgamation of the names of two local churches, namely Bethel Baptist and Berea Methodist.

In 1925, Bethera had 22 inhabitants.

References

Unincorporated communities in Berkeley County, South Carolina
Unincorporated communities in South Carolina